Ottoman court was the culture that evolved around the court of the Ottoman Empire.

Ottoman court was held at the Topkapı Palace in Constantinople where the sultan was served by an army of pages and scholars. Some served in the Treasury and the Armoury, maintaining the sultan's treasures and weapons. There was also a branch of servants that were said to serve the Chamber of Campaign, i.e. they accompanied the sultan and his court while on campaign. The best of the pages were chosen to serve the sultan in person. One was responsible for the sultan's clothing, one served him with drinks, one carried his weaponry, one helped him mount his horse, one was responsible for making his turban and a barber shaved the sultan every day. At the palace served also a great number of stewards who carried food, water and wood throughout the palace and lit the fireplaces and braziers. Doorkeepers (Kapıcı) numbered several hundreds and were responsible for opening the doors throughout the entire palace. The chief doorkeeper was responsible for escorting important guests to the sultan.

The Harem was under the administration of the eunuchs, of which there were two categories, Black and White Eunuchs. An important figure in the Ottoman court was the Chief Black Eunuch (Kızlar Ağası or Harem Ağası). In control of the Harem and a perfect net of spies in the Black Eunuchs, the Chief Eunuch was involved in almost every palace intrigue and could thereby gain power over either the sultan or one of his viziers, ministers or other court officials.

The Harem was a small world in itself. Often the mother of the current sultan (Valide sultan) was a politically influential person. She also selected the concubines for her son. The concubines could live in or around the palace for their entire life, and it supported them with whatever they needed. Women not found suitable for the sultan were married off to eligible bachelors from the Ottoman nobility or sent back home. Female servants did all the chores such as serving food and making the beds.

Court positions
Şeyhülislam: The Şeyhülislam (the Ottoman rendering of the Arabic ) of the Ottoman Sultan was the supreme religious authority in the Ottoman Empire. This man instructed the Sultan himself in affairs of the Qu'ran.

Kızlar Ağası: The Kızlar Ağası was the chief Black Eunuch of the Ottoman Seraglio. The title literally means "Chief of the Girls," and he was charged with the protection and maintenance of the harem women.

Kapı Ağası: Whereas the Kızlar Ağası was responsible for guarding the virtue of the odalisques, the Kapı Ağası was a chamberlain to the ladies. His name means "Lord of the Door," and he was the chief of the White Eunuchs, acting as a chief servant and procurer.

Bostancı-başı: The Bostancı-başı of the Ottoman Court was his Chief Executioner. The title directly translates as "Head Gardener" (Bostancı=Gardener, başı=head), and it was his job to quite literally "prune" the court of its dead weight and its bad apples: this is, people who committed crimes in the eyes of the court rules.

Valide Sultan: The Valide sultan was the mother of the reigning Sultan, and the most powerful woman in the Harem, not to mention the Empire. She was the absolute authority in the seraglio, and she, with the help of the Kapı Ağa and the Kızlar Ağası, often her confidantes, or even men she herself had chosen upon her accession, had a finger in every aspect of harem life.

Haseki Sultan: This was the title reserved for the chief consort and lawfully wedded wife of the Ottoman Sultan. A Haseki Sultan had an important place in the palace, being the most powerful woman and enjoyed the greatest status in the imperial harem after valide sultan and usually had chambers close to the sultan's chamber. The haseki had no blood relation with the reigning sultan but ranked higher than the sultan's own sisters and aunts, the princesses of the dynasty. Her elevated imperial status derived from the fact that she was the mother of a potential future sultan.

Kadın: Among the women of the Imperial Harem, the Kadın is the woman (or women) who have given the Sultan a child, preferably a son. Kadin was equivalent to a wife.

Baş Kadın: The first/most senior consorts were called Baş Kadın or Birinci Kadın. The consorts who carried title "Baş Kadın" was in the second rank and most powerful after Valide sultan in harem. She had a great influence in harem. Before creation and after abolition of the title haseki, this title (Baş Kadın) was the most powerful position for the consorts of Sultan. A sultan did not have more than four Kadin (same law used for legal wives in Islam) Their position as the possible mother of a future Sultan gave them much influence and power in the harem.

Ikbal: Beneath the Kadın was the Ikbal, the harem member with whom the Sultan had slept at least once. These women need not necessarily have given a child to the Sultan, but simply need to have taken his fancy. Many of these women were referred to as Gözde (meaning "Favorite"), or "in the Eye," having done just that: caught the eye of the Sultan.

Cariye: These were the women who served the Valide Sultan, Ikbal's, Kadin's and the Sultan's children. They could be promoted to Kalfas which meant they were free and earned wages, otherwise they were the property of the Sultan and would reside in the Harem. Such women were free to go after nine years of service.

References